Epinonimous is the debut album released by the Australian Hip Hop group Downsyde. Although Downsyde are now quite well known throughout Australia, this album is hard to get hold of. It was released in September 2000.

Track listing 
All songs written by Damien Allia, Shahbaz Rind, D. Reutens and Scott Griffiths.

"Intro" - 1:21
"Reap What We Sow" - 4:52
"Subconscious Cyclones" - 4:02
"Raiders Of The Lost Art" - 4:49
"Something Natural" - 4:43 
"Matty B's Insight" - 0:56
"Y2K - You're All Too Cautious" - 3:51
"Who's Ya Server" - 3:47
"Battle Me" - 3:52
"Ya So Fake" - 8:52
"Microphone Masters" - 3:14

References

External links
Track & Production Details, therapcella.com

2000 debut albums
Downsyde albums